Jan Mulder is the name of:
 Jan Mulder (musician, born 1963), Dutch pianist, composer, and orchestra conductor
 Jan Mulder (cyclist, born 1878), Dutch track cyclist and speed skater
 Jan Mulder (cyclist, born 1956), Dutch cyclist, see Cycling at the 2004 Summer Paralympics
 Jan Mulder (footballer) (born 1945), Dutch former soccer player and current columnist
 Jan Mulder (politician) (born 1943), Dutch politician People's Party for Freedom and Democracy